Ambulyx tattina is a species of moth of the family Sphingidae first described by Karl Jordan in 1919.

Distribution 
It is known from Thailand, Malaysia, Borneo, Sumatra, Java and the Philippines.

Description 
It can be distinguished from other Ambulyx species by the absence of subbasal dark patches on the forewing, and the division of the distal third sharply into pale anterior and dark posterior halves.

Gallery

Subspecies
Ambulyx tattina tattina (Thailand, Malaysia, Borneo, Sumatra, Java, the Philippines) 
Ambulyx tattina uichancoi (Clark, 1938) (the Philippines)

References

Ambulyx
Moths described in 1919
Moths of Asia